Karl W. Steinbuch (June 15, 1917 in Stuttgart-Bad Cannstatt – June 4, 2005 in Ettlingen) was a German computer scientist,  cyberneticist, and electrical engineer.  He was an early and influential researcher of German computer science, and was the developer of the Lernmatrix, an early implementation of artificial neural networks. Steinbuch also wrote about the societal implications of modern media.

Biography 
Steinbuch studied at the University of Stuttgart and in 1944 he received his PhD in physics. In 1948 he joined Standard Elektrik Lorenz (SEL, part of the ITT group) in Stuttgart, as a computer design engineer and later as a director of research and development, where he filed more than 70 patents. There Steinbuch completed the first European fully transistorized computer, the ER 56 marketed by SEL. In 1958 he became professor and director of the institute of technology for information processing (ITIV) of the University of Karlsruhe, where he retired in 1980.

In 1967 he began publishing books, in which he tried to influence German education policy. Together with books from colleagues like Jean Ziegler from Switzerland, Eric J. Hobsbawm from UK, and John Naisbitt his books predicted what he regarded as the coming education disaster of the emerging civic lobby society.

In 1957, together with Helmut Gröttrup, Steinbuch coined the term Informatik, the German word for computer science, which gave informatics, and the term kybernetische Anthropologie.

Awards and recognition 

Wilhelm-Boelsche award - medal in Gold
German non-fiction book award
Gold medal award of the XXI. International Congresses on Aerospace Medicine
Konrad Adenauer award of science
Jakob Fugger award medal
Medal of merit of the state of Baden-Wuerttemberg
member, German Academy of Sciences Leopoldina
member, International Academy of Science, Munich.
grants from a state government grants program, named "Karl-Steinbuch-Stipendium"
 at the Karlsruhe Institute of Technology named after him

Books 
Steinbuch wrote several books and articles, including:
 1957 Informatik: Automatische Informationsverarbeitung ("Informatics: automatic information processing").
 1963 Learning matrices and their applications (together with U. A. W. Piske)
 1965 A critical comparison of two kinds of adaptive classification networks (together with Bernard Widrow)
 1966 (1969): Die informierte Gesellschaft. Geschichte und Zukunft der Nachrichtentechnik (The informed society. History and Future of telecommunications)
 1989: Die desinformierte Gesellschaft (The disinformed society)
 1968: Falsch programmiert. Über das Versagen unserer Gesellschaft in der Gegenwart und vor der Zukunft und was eigentlich geschehen müßte. (as a bestseller listet in: Der Spiegel) (Programmed falsely. About our society's failure in the present and with respect to the future and what should be done.)
 1969: Programm 2000. (as a bestseller listet in: Der Spiegel)
 1971: Automat und Mensch. Auf dem Weg zu einer kybernetischen Anthropologie (Machine and Man. On the way to a cybernetic anthropology; 4th revised edition)
 1971: Mensch Technik Zukunft. Probleme von Morgen (German non-fiction book award) (Man Technology Future. Problems of Tomorrow)
 1973: Kurskorrektur (Correcting the Course)
 1978: Maßlos informiert. Die Enteignung des Denkens (Excessively informed. The Deprivation of Thinking)
 1984: Unsere manipulierte Demokratie. Müssen wir mit der linken Lüge leben? (Our Thought-controlled Democracy. Do we have to live with the leftist lie?)

References

External links 
 
 http://xputers.informatik.uni-kl.de/papers/publications/karl-steinbuch.html
 http://helios.informatik.uni-kl.de/euology.pdf 
 https://web.archive.org/web/20120618185338/http://www.karl-steinbuch-stipendium.de/karlsteinbuch.html

1917 births
2005 deaths
Cyberneticists
German computer scientists
German electrical engineers
20th-century German inventors
Machine learning researchers
Engineers from Stuttgart
Recipients of the Order of Merit of Baden-Württemberg